{{Merger with Franks Tract State Recreation Area has been proposed. Please see Talk page.}}

The Antioch Bombing Target a 500-acre (200 ha) plot was a United States Navy target used from 1943 to 1952. It is now part of the Franks Tract State Recreation Area.

References

External links
Information on the history of the range

Closed installations of the United States Navy
Sacramento–San Joaquin River Delta
Military in the San Francisco Bay Area
History of Contra Costa County, California